Cohansey may refer to:
Cohansey Township, New Jersey, a former township
Cohansey, New Jersey, an unincorporated community
Cohansey River, a river in New Jersey